Vineland is an unincorporated community in Jefferson County, in the U.S. state of Missouri.

History
Vineland was platted in 1869, and named for vineyards near the original town site. A post office called Vineland was established in 1867, and remained in operation until 1955.

References

Unincorporated communities in Jefferson County, Missouri
Unincorporated communities in Missouri